At the Supper Club Part III may refer to:
 At the Supper Club Part III (Perry Como album)
 At the Supper Club Part III (Jo Stafford album)